Lirsiah may refer to:
 Lirsiah-e Shapuri